Trag is a village and Union Council of Mianwali District in the Punjab province of Pakistan. It is in Isakhel tehsil, and is one of the populated villages in the Mianwali District. Many seasonal rivers passes through the area during monsoon season which collect the water from slopes of Koh-e-Suleman. Water from these rivers flow towards the Indus river and can over flow damaging Trag. Three seasonal rivers are named Raka, Lunda and Baroch.

Background

Trag is named after an ancestor or elder, literally meaning an “Iron Helmet”, He was the Great Grandson of Isa Khan Niazi's Paternal uncle Shaado Khan Niazi. He was a combatant in Haibat Khan Niazi's army. The village emerged between 1660-1685. It is populated mainly by Niazi Pathans, originally Afghan in origin and came from route starting in Wana and then going to Tank, Dera Ismail Khan, Lakki Marwat and Isakhel before finally coming to Trag.

Other Tribes
Trag, although home to many Niazi Pathans is also home to many other tribes and clans that also reside in the Isakhel region. Trag is also home to Malik tribe and includes sub-cast like Pora, Bucha etc. These people have settled here for years and migrated from different parts of KPK and other areas across Pakistan. People from nearby districts of KPK such as Lakki Marwat and Karak come to the village and also traders from these areas buy large amounts of wheat and wheat straw to feed their animals in winter season. The majority of the tribes are involved in agricultural practices and grow crops such as wheat, moongbean, maize, millet, sugarcane, cotton etc. Pet animals are buffalo, cows, goats, sheep, donkeys and horses.

Further reading
 Muhhammad Iqbal Khan, Tareekh e Niazai Qabail, Tajay Khel, 2018.

References

Populated places in Mianwali District